Eucithara paucicostata is a small sea snail, a marine gastropod mollusk in the family Mangeliidae.

This is not Mangelia paucicostata Risso, A., 1826.

Description

Distribution
This marine species occurs in Polynesia and off Tahiti

References

 Pease, W. H. 1868. Synonymy of marine gastropodae inhabiting Polynesia. American 1. Conch. 4: 103-132
 Bouge, L.J. & Dautzenberg, P.L. 1914. Les Pleurotomides de la Nouvelle-Caledonie et de ses dependances. Journal de Conchyliologie 61: 123-214

External links
  Tucker, J.K. 2004 Catalog of recent and fossil turrids (Mollusca: Gastropoda). Zootaxa 682:1-1295.
 G.W. Tryon (1884) Manual of Conchology, structural and systematic, with illustrations of the species, vol. VI; Philadelphia, Academy of Natural Sciences
 CalPhotos: photo

paucicostata
Gastropods described in 1868